Burton Stephen Lancaster (November 2, 1913 – October 20, 1994) was an American actor and producer. Initially known for playing tough guys with a tender heart, he went on to achieve success with more complex and challenging roles over a 45-year career in film and, later, television. He was a four-time nominee for the Academy Award for Best Actor (winning once), and he also won two BAFTA Awards and one Golden Globe Award for Best Lead Actor.

Lancaster performed as a circus acrobat in the 1930s. After serving in World War II, the 32-year-old Lancaster landed a role in a Broadway play and drew the attention of a Hollywood agent. His breakthrough role was the film noir The Killers in 1946 alongside Ava Gardner. A critical success, it launched both of their careers. In 1953, Lancaster played the illicit lover of Deborah Kerr in the military drama From Here to Eternity. A box office smash, it won eight Academy Awards, including Best Picture, and landed a Best Actor nomination for Lancaster. In 1956, he starred in The Rainmaker, with Katharine Hepburn, earning a Best Actor Golden Globe nomination, and in 1957 he starred in Gunfight at the O.K. Corral with frequent co-star Kirk Douglas. During the 1950s, his production company, Hecht-Hill-Lancaster, was highly successful, with Lancaster acting in films such as: Trapeze in 1956, a box office smash in which he used his acrobatic skills; Sweet Smell of Success (1957), a dark drama today considered a classic; Run Silent, Run Deep (1958), a WWII submarine drama with Clark Gable; and Separate Tables (1958), a hotel-set drama which received seven Oscar nominations.

In the early 1960s, Lancaster starred in a string of critically successful films, each in very disparate roles. Playing a charismatic biblical con-man in Elmer Gantry in 1960 won him the Academy Award and the Golden Globe for Best Actor. He played a Nazi war criminal in 1961 in the all-star, war-crime-trial film, Judgment at Nuremberg. Playing a bird expert prisoner in Birdman of Alcatraz in 1962, he earned the BAFTA Award for Best Foreign Actor and his third Oscar nomination. In 1963, Lancaster traveled to Italy to star as an Italian prince in the epic period drama The Leopard. In 1964, he played a US Air Force general who, opposed by a colonel played by Kirk Douglas, tries to overthrow the president in Seven Days in May. Then, in 1966, he played an explosives expert in the western The Professionals.

In 1970, Lancaster starred in the box-office hit, air-disaster drama Airport. He experienced a career resurgence in 1980 with the crime-romance Atlantic City, winning the BAFTA for Best Actor and landing his fourth Oscar nomination. Starting in the late 1970s, he also appeared in television mini-series, including the award-winning Separate but Equal with Sidney Poitier. He continued acting into his late 70s, until a stroke in 1990 forced him to retire; four years later he died from a heart attack. His final film role was in the Oscar-nominated Field of Dreams.

Film

As actor

As producer

Television

References

External links 

 

American filmographies
Male actor filmographies